Mount Hanover is a mountain summit located in British Columbia, Canada.

Description 
Mount Hanover is a 1,748-meter-elevation (5,735-foot) peak situated in Cypress Provincial Park, 24 kilometers (15 miles) north of Vancouver, in the Britannia Range of the North Shore Mountains, which are subsets of the Coast Mountains. Hanover is the second-highest peak of the North Shore Mountains, after Brunswick Mountain. Precipitation runoff from Mount Hanover drains east to the Capilano River, and west to Howe Sound via Deeks Creek. Mount Hanover is more notable for its steep rise above local terrain than for its absolute elevation. Topographic relief is significant as the summit rises 1,748 meters (5,735 feet) above Howe Sound in five kilometers (3.1 miles).

History 
The first ascent of the summit was made May 23, 1913, by Don Munday, Ben Hanafin and Edward LaPage. The mountain's toponym was officially adopted December 7, 1937, by the Geographical Names Board of Canada. The peaks in the Britannia Range (Mts. Brunswick, Hanover, Windsor) are named for British royalty, in this case the House of Hanover.

Climate 
Based on the Köppen climate classification, Mount Hanover is located in the marine west coast climate zone of western North America. Most weather fronts originate in the Pacific Ocean, and travel east toward the Coast Mountains where they are forced upward by the range (Orographic lift), causing them to drop their moisture in the form of rain or snowfall. As a result, the Coast Mountains experience high precipitation, especially during the winter months in the form of snowfall. Temperatures in winter can drop below −20 °C with wind chill factors below −30 °C.

See also 
 Geography of British Columbia

Gallery

References

External links
 Mount Hanover: weather forecast

One-thousanders of British Columbia
North Shore Mountains
North Vancouver (district municipality)